The 2022 Spain Women's Sevens was played as two back-to-back rugby sevens tournaments on consecutive weekends in late January that year. These events were hosted  by the Spanish Rugby Federation as the third and fourth stops on the 2021–22 season of the World Rugby Women's Sevens Series. It was the first time the series was held in Spain.

The United States won the first tournament, held at Estadio Ciudad in Málaga from 21–23 January, defeating Russia in the final by 35–10. The second tournament, held from 28–30 January at Estadio de La Cartuja in Seville, was won by series-leader Australia, with a score of 17–12 over first-time cup finalist Ireland.

Format
The twelve teams are drawn into three pools of four. Each team will play their other three opponents in their pool once. The top two teams from each pool advance to the Cup bracket, with the two best third-placed teams also advancing. The remaining four teams will compete for a 9th–12th placing.

Teams 
The twelve national women's teams competing in Spain were:

 
  
 
 
 
 
 
  
  (Seville only)
 
 
 

 
England, who were represented by Great Britain for the first two tournaments of the 2021–22 Series, returned to compete as a separate national union for the remainder of the series.

Poland was invited to participate for the first time in a World Sevens Series.

Belgium was also invited to participate for the first time in a World Sevens Series, replacing New Zealand who were unable to travel due to the COVID-19 pandemic.

Fiji did not compete in Spain. The team withdrew from both tournaments after members of their squad tested positive for COVID-19. However, Fiji was not replaced in the draw for Málaga. Their matches were recorded as  byes and their opponents awarded wins automatically via walkover. As such, despite not playing, Fiji was placed twelfth in Málaga and received one point toward their season standings from the event.

Portugal was invited to participate in Seville, replacing Fiji.

Málaga

Pool stage – Málaga

Pool A – Málaga

Pool B – Málaga

Pool C – Málaga

Ranking of third-placed teams – Málaga

Knockout stage – Málaga

9th–12th playoffs – Málaga

5th–8th playoffs – Málaga

Cup playoffs – Málaga

Placings – Málaga

Source: World Rugby

Seville

Pool stage – Seville
The draw for the pool stage of the Seville Sevens was announced via Twitter on 24 January.

Pool A – Seville

Pool B – Seville

Pool C – Seville

Ranking of third-placed teams – Seville

Knockout stage – Seville

9th–12th playoffs – Seville

5th–8th playoffs – Seville

Cup playoffs – Seville

Placings – Seville

Source: World Rugby

See also
 2022 Spain Sevens (for men)

References
Notes

Citations

External links 
 Tournament site 
 World Rugby info: Málaga
 World Rugby info: Seville

2022
2021–22 World Rugby Women's Sevens Series
2022 in women's rugby union 
2022 rugby sevens competitions
January 2022 sports events in Spain